Les barbares is a 1901 tragédie lyrique in 3 acts by Camille Saint-Saëns to a libretto by Victorien Sardou and Pierre-Barthélemy Gheusi. The opera was originally intended for the Roman theatre of Orange, in Provence, but instead premiered at the Paris Opéra Palais Garnier in October 1901.

Roles
Floria - chief vestal virgin (soprano) 
Marcomir - leader of the Barbarians (tenor) 
Le Récitant (bass)
Scaurus (bass)
Le Veilleur (tenor)
Hildibrath (baritone)
Livie (contralto)
Germains, légionnaires, romains, habitants d'Orange, vestales, femmes, enfants gallo-romains.

Recordings
Les Barbares : Catherine Hunold (Floria), Julia Gertseva (Livie), Edgaras Montvidas (Marcomir), Jean Teitgen (Le Récitant / Scaurus), Shawn Mathey (Le Veilleur), Philippe Rouillon (Hildibrath / Le Grand Sacrificateur), Tigran Guiragosyan (Premier Habitant), Laurent Pouliaude (Second Habitant), Ghezlane Hanzazi (Une Femme) Choeur Lyrique et Orchestre Symphonique Saint-Étienne Loire, conducted Laurent Campellone. Ediciones singulares. 2015

References

External links

Operas
Operas by Camille Saint-Saëns
French-language operas
1901 operas